Methods in Molecular Biology is a book series published by Humana Press (an imprint of Springer Science+Business Media) that covers molecular biology research methods and protocols. The book series was introduced by series editor John M. Walker in 1983 and provides step-by-step instructions for carrying out experiments in a research lab. As of January 2020, more than 2000 volumes (2471 as of 10-March-2022) had been published in the series. The protocols are also available online in SpringerLink, and were previously in Springer Protocols.

Each protocol opens with an introductory overview and a list of the materials and reagents needed to complete the experiment. Every protocol is followed by a detailed procedure that is supported with a notes section offering tips and "tricks of the trade" as well as troubleshooting advice.

See also 
Biological Procedures Online

References

External links 
 

Book series introduced in 1983
Research methods
Series of non-fiction books